Football Club San-Pédro is an Ivorian football club based in San-Pédro.

Current squad

Out on loan

Honours
Côte d'Ivoire Premier Division: 0

Côte d'Ivoire Cup: 1
 2019.

Coupe de la Ligue de Côte d'Ivoire: 0

Félix Houphouët-Boigny Cup: 0

References

External links
Official website 
Club profile – soccerway.com 

Football clubs in Abidjan
Association football clubs established in 2004
2004 establishments in Ivory Coast
Sports clubs in Ivory Coast